Brett James Ogle (born 14 July 1964) is an Australian professional golfer.

Early life
Ogle was born in Paddington, New South Wales, adopted at 6 weeks of age and was brought up in the town of Goulburn. He was a successful hockey player in his early years representing Southern Zone. He was also a State Champion sprinter at 200m and table tennis player, winning the NSW Schoolboys doubles title in 1978. He took up the game of golf not long after and reduced his golfing handicap from 32 to 1 in just two years. He was the Senior and Junior Club Champion at his home club in Goulburn, Tully Park. His first big break through was the Senior and Junior Club Champion of Champions event at the Federal Golf Club in 1980, a tournament that pitted all of the NSW Club Champions together. Ogle then won the NSW Junior in 1984 and 1985 along with NSW Amateur in 1985 turning pro in December of that year.

Professional career
In 1986 Ogle had his break through win on the South Pacific Tour winning the Fijian Hotel Pro Am event and also the Pacific Budget Rent a Car Open at the Robert Trent Jones course Pacific Harbour. After a stint on the Asian and Japan Tours, Ogle headed to the European Qualifying tournament in Spain at the end of 1987 where he was successful in gaining a full-time playing card for that Tour. In 1988 Ogle won his first big event on the Australasian Tour winning the Tasmanian Open. Later that year he finished third behind Rodger Davis and Fred Couples at the Bi Centennial Classic at that time it was Australia's biggest ever tournament with Davis defeating Couples in a playoff to claim the $500,000 first prize. In 1989 Ogle broke through on the European Tour winning the Equity & Law Challenge in 1989 and then in 1990 claimed the AGF Open in France. That year he had his best finish on the Order of Merit, 24th place. He also ended the 1989 and 1992 seasons inside the top 30.

At the end of 1992, Ogle tied for medalist honors at the PGA Tour Qualifying Tournament. He won his first PGA Tour title in just his fourth event of 1993, the AT&T Pebble Beach National Pro-Am. He won one other tournament on the tour, the Hawaiian Open in 1994. He was unable to maintain that form as he struggled with the yips, and lost his card at the end of the 1996 season.

Since retiring from Tournament golf in 2002, Ogle was lead analyst and commentator for Fox Sports until retiring from the organization in 2016. Ogle is also the brand Ambassador for Australia's biggest golf retailer Drummond Golf.

Professional wins (14)

PGA Tour wins (2)

European Tour wins (1)

PGA Tour of Australasia wins (5)

Other wins (6)
1985 Air Pacific Budget Open (Fiji)
1986 Tahiti Open, Fijian Hotel Pro-am
1989 Equity & Law Challenge
1992 World Cup (individual)
1996 West Coast Classic (Canada)

Results in major championships

CUT = missed the half-way cut
"T" = tied

Results in The Players Championship

CUT = missed the halfway cut
"T" indicates a tie for a place

Team appearances
Amateur
Nomura Cup (representing Australia): 1985 (winners)
Australian Men's Interstate Teams Matches (representing New South Wales): 1984, 1985 (winners)

Professional
World Cup (representing Australia): 1992 (individual winner), 1995

See also
1992 PGA Tour Qualifying School graduates

Notes

References

External links

Australian male golfers
European Tour golfers
PGA Tour golfers
PGA Tour of Australasia golfers
Golfers from Sydney
People from Goulburn
Sportsmen from New South Wales
Golfers from Melbourne
1964 births
Living people